Ali Öztürk (born 12 April 1987) is a Turkish footballer who plays as a striker for Kuşadasıspor. He started his career in Altinoluk Belediyespor and then Balıkesir Belediyespor. After then he transferred to Balıkesirspor in youth team then signed his first professional contract in there.

He was born in Develi but spent long time in Altınoluk, Balıkesir.

External links

References

1987 births
People from Develi
Living people
Turkish footballers
Association football forwards
Balıkesirspor footballers
Manisa FK footballers
24 Erzincanspor footballers
Süper Lig players
TFF First League players
TFF Second League players
TFF Third League players